In astronomy, the curve of growth describes the equivalent width of a spectral line as a function of the column density of the material from which the spectral line is observed.

References

Spectroscopy